Psychic is the debut album by electronic music duo Darkside, consisting of Nicolás Jaar and Dave Harrington. It was released on October 4, 2013 on Matador Records.

Critical reception

Upon its release, Psychic received critical acclaim. At Metacritic, which assigns a weighted average score out of 100 to reviews and ratings from mainstream critics, the album has received a metascore of 79, based on 22 reviews, indicating "generally favorable reviews".

The album received several year-end accolades, ranking highly among reviewers.

Accolades (Year-end) 

N/A denotes that the albums are unranked in the list.

Accolades (Decade) 
Additionally, the album was listed in some full decade lists of best albums in the 2010s.

Track listing

Personnel
Credits adapted from the liner notes of Psychic.

Darkside
 Dave Harrington – production, writing, guitars, bass, acoustic bass, organ, electric piano, pianet, synthesizers, clarinet, drum machines, percussion, electronics, effects
 Nicolás Jaar – production, writing, vocals, sequencing, drum programming, synthesizers, wurlitzer, mellotron, drum machines, percussion, electronics, effects, mixing

Additional personnel
 Brian Gardner – mastering
 Matt de Jong – design, layout
 Jed DeMoss – photography

Charts

References

2013 debut albums
Darkside (band) albums
Matador Records albums